Hot Chocolate Massage is an album by the folk rock band Tiny Lights, released in 1990 by Absolute A Go Go Records. Jane Scarpantoni played cello on the album. "Wave" was a minor hit on college radio stations.

Release and reception 

Trouser Press felt that extensive touring had given the band "muscle and maturity" and noted the overall live feeling of the album. The AllMusic critic Jason Ankeny criticized the album for lacking focus because of excessive experimentation. Despite this he gave it four and a half out of five stars, calling the high points of Hot Chocolate Massage "sublime" and "daring and eclectic." Option wrote that "there's a wonderful sense of energy and daring to this LP that, more than a lot of current bands, brings the spirit of '60s experimental groups like the Insect Trust and the Ultimate Spinach to mind."

Track listing

Personnel 

Tiny Lights
 Donna Croughn – vocals, violin
 Andy Demos – drums, clarinet, soprano saxophone, tenor saxophone
 Dave Dreiwitz – bass guitar, trumpet, vocals
 John Hamilton – guitar, vocals, production
 Jane Scarpantoni – cello, vocals

Additional musicians and production
 Henry Hirsch – clavinet on "Closer"

References

External links 
 

Tiny Lights albums
1990 albums